Bourne Free is an annual pride festival in Bournemouth, England.

History

The festival was established in 2004 when a far right organisation was due to come to Bournemouth to demonstrate against homosexuality. Many prominent figures and active members of the LGBT community in the area came together to organise an event in the Lower Gardens to defend LGBT people from the event and create a day of celebration rather than hostility.

The event included entertainment at The Bandstand, a balloon release with a two-minute silence for victims of hate crime, and Bournemouth's first Gay Pride march. The Bourne Free committee that had organised the event continued organising Bourne Free as an annual charity event. In 2006, event was renamed as the Bourne Free Pride Festival.

In 2008 the Pride Parade moved onto the streets of Bournemouth. An estimated more than 4,000 people attended the event that year.

In 2020 the event was postponed due to the COVID-19 pandemic. The event returned in person in 2021.

Themes for the event include "Paint the World with your Pride" (2019) and "Stronger Together" (2021).

External links
Official Bourne Free Pride Festival website

References 

Pride parades in England
Tourist attractions in Bournemouth
Festivals in Dorset
Recurring events established in 2004
2004 establishments in England